Josef Slavík (26 March 1806 – 30 May 1833), also known as Josef Slawjk or Joseph Slawik, was a Bohemian violin virtuoso and composer, who was expected by Vienna musical critics to become Paganini's successor after composing a supposedly unplayable Concerto in F-sharp minor and teaching himself to play Paganini's "La Campanella" after a single hearing.

Career

The first son of Barbora (born Krásová) and Antonín Slavík, teacher and musician, who started to teach Josef violin in the age of four.

Later on, he was a student of violin by Friedrich Wilhelm Pixis and music theory and composition by Friedrich Dionys Weber at the Prague Conservatory. Pixis wondered how anyone could write down such mad, unplayable stuff after seeing some of Slavík's compositions (a concerto, variations, etc.). Before leaving Prague, Slavík proved at a farewell concert at the Prague Conservatory that there was at least one who could play the mad stuff. He went to Vienna in 1825 and became a sensation. He was then a young man of nineteen, but already technically superior to other violinists that had been heard in the Austrian capital. The celebrated Mayseder called him a second Lipinski.

Frédéric Chopin who heard Slavík on several occasions described his skills as: 
"With the exception of Paganini, I have never heard a player like him. Ninety-six staccatos in one bow! It is almost incredible! He plays like a second Paganini, but a rejuvenated one, who will perhaps in time surpass the first. Slavík fascinates the listener and brings tears into his eyes... he makes humans weep, more he makes tigers weep."

Franz Schubert composed two violin sonata-like pieces for Slavík and pianist Carl Maria von Bocklet: the Rondo in B minor, D 895 (1826), and the Fantasy in C major, D 934 (1827).

Works

 Variations in E Major (1820)
 Violin Concerto in F-sharp minor (1823, conservatory graduation work)
 Capriccios in D Major (1824)
 Grand-potpourri (1825)
 Rondino for violin and piano (1826)
 Violin concerto in A Minor (1827)
 Piano Polonese in D Major (1828)
 Violin variations on G String for Violin and Piano "Il Pirata" (1832)

References

Sources

External links
 

1806 births
1833 deaths
19th-century classical violinists
Czech Romantic composers
People from Příbram District
Burials at Vyšehrad Cemetery